Ano Patisia, also known as Ano Patissia on signage, is an Athens Metro station in Ano Patisia, Athens, Greece. The current station is built on a viaduct at the location of a train station on the former Lavriou Square-Strofyli railway line.

The old station of Attica Railways was opened on 4 February 1885 and closed down on 8 August 1938, pending electrification. The railway level crossing, which was replaced with a viaduct when the line was electrified, gave the location its old name Alyssida.

The station was converted to standard gauge and was opened as part of the extension of Hellenic Electric Railways to Kifissia in February 1956. The station has two platforms and a reversing siding located between the up and down lines, which can connect to either track, so it can be used as a terminal station if needed. Ano Patissia station was actually used until 1985 as the northern terminus of a local service Thision-Patisia, to improve the service in the central part of the line. After a recent renovation for the 2004 Olympic Games, the station features escalators and lifts for the disabled.

The station is located next to the Eastern Orthodox parish church of Saint Barbara and near the shopping area of Ano Patisia.

References

Athens Metro stations
Railway stations opened in 1956
1956 establishments in Greece